Aristotelia fungivorella is a moth of the family Gelechiidae. It was described by James Brackenridge Clemens in 1865. It is found in North America, where it has been recorded from Ontario to British Columbia, south to California, Mississippi and Alabama.

The wingspan is about 11 mm.

The larvae within galls of Salix cordata and Salix exigua.

References

Moths described in 1865
Aristotelia (moth)
Moths of North America